Combined English Universities was a university constituency represented in the United Kingdom Parliament (from 1918 until 1950). It was formed by enfranchising and combining all the English universities, except for Cambridge, Oxford and London which were already separately represented. The constituency effectively represented the red brick universities and Durham University with two members of parliament.

Boundaries
This university constituency was created by the Representation of the People Act 1918 and abolished in 1950 by the Representation of the People Act 1948.

The original proposal of the Speaker's Conference, which considered electoral reform before the 1918 legislation was prepared, was to combine all the English and Welsh universities except for Oxford and Cambridge into a three-member constituency. However, during consideration of the legislation it was agreed that London University alone should continue to return one member. The University of Wales was also given its own seat. The other universities, which were still to be combined, had their proposed representation reduced to two members.

Combined English Universities was not a physical area. Its electorate consisted of the graduates of the universities included in the seat.

The universities represented by this constituency were Birmingham, Bristol, Durham, Leeds, Liverpool, Manchester, Reading (from August 1928) and Sheffield.

The constituency returned two members of Parliament, elected at general elections by the single transferable vote method of proportional representation. However, the first past the post system was used in by-elections.

Members of Parliament
This is a list of people who were elected to represent these English universities in the Parliament of the United Kingdom between 1918 and 1950. The elections were not held on the polling dates for general elections in the territorial constituencies. The university constituency elections were held over five days, not on the ordinary polling date, so that plural voting graduates could vote in their place of residence and then visit their university to participate in its election.

Constituency created (1918)

Elections
There were six contested STV elections. The MPs in 1935 were returned unopposed. By-elections, to fill a single seat, used the first past the post or relative majority electoral system.

Elections in the 1910s

Elections in the 1920s

 As two candidates achieved the quota only one count was necessary

Elections in the 1930s

Elections in the 1940s

Notes

References
 
 
 
 
 
 

University constituencies of the Parliament of the United Kingdom
Historic parliamentary constituencies in England
Constituencies of the Parliament of the United Kingdom established in 1918
Constituencies of the Parliament of the United Kingdom disestablished in 1950
1918 establishments in England
Higher education in England